Luise Heilborn-Körbitz (25 July 1874 – 15 January 1961) was a German screenwriter. Active during the silent era, she often worked on the director Gerhard Lamprecht's films.

Selected filmography
 The Graveyard of the Living (1921)
 The Buddenbrooks (1923)
 The House Without Laughter (1923)
 Zaida, the Tragedy of a Model (1923)
 The Hanseatics (1925)
 Slums of Berlin (1925)
 The Company Worth Millions (1925)
 Children of No Importance (1926)
 Kubinke the Barber (1926)
 People to Each Other (1926)
 Sister Veronika (1927)
 Tough Guys, Easy Girls (1927)
 The Catwalk (1927)
 Under the Lantern (1928)
 Eva in Silk (1928)
 When the Mother and the Daughter (1928)
 The Old Fritz (1928)
 Sir or Madam (1928)
 The Man with the Frog (1929)

References

Bibliography 
 Hans-Michael Bock and Tim Bergfelder. The Concise Cinegraph: An Encyclopedia of German Cinema. Berghahn Books, 2009.

External links 
 

1874 births
1961 deaths
Film people from Berlin
20th-century German screenwriters